Andrea Nicole Livingstone (born July 10, 1985), known as Nic Stone, is an American author of young adult fiction and middle grade fiction, best known for her debut novel Dear Martin and her middle grade debut, Clean Getaway. Her novels have been translated into six languages.

Personal life 
Stone was born and raised in a suburb of Atlanta, Georgia. She has a degree in Psychology from Spelman College. She is African-American and is openly bisexual. After college, she worked in teen mentoring and moved to Israel for a few years.

Career 
During a trip to Israel in 2008, Stone discovered that she wanted to become a writer when encountering a family with a story that fascinated her. Stone wrote her first novel for young adults in 2017, inspired by American young adult novelist Veronica Roth's Divergent series because it was the first series featuring black characters that she encountered that lives until the end. That same book later landed her a literary agent.

Dear Martin
Her debut novel Dear Martin, about a high school senior in a predominantly white school who starts writing letters to Dr. Martin Luther King Jr. after he has a dangerous encounter with racist police officers, was sold as a proposal in a two-book deal and published in 2017 by Crown Books for Young Readers. Stone has stated she began writing her debut novel Dear Martin after the death of Jordan Davis, a 17-year-old black high school student who was fatally shot by a white man in a hate crime in 2017.  The book debuted on the New York Times bestseller list at #4. It was also chosen as a finalist for the William C. Morris award in 2017 and received a starred review from Booklist. It has been published and translated in Germany, Brazil, Indonesia, The Netherlands, UK, Turkey, and Romania. Two years after it was first published, Dear Martin again hit the New York Times bestseller list, for Young Adult Paperbacks and at #1, in February 2020.

A sequel, Dear Justyce, about an incarcerated teen who is on trial for murder charges, was published in October 2020. Stone says she was not planning on writing a sequel. but encouraged by her publisher, and decided to write a book about a " black boy that everybody is afraid of."

Clean Getaway 
Her Middle Grade debut, Clean Getaway, illustrated by Dawud Anyabwile, was published by Crown in January 2020. It tells the story of an 11-year-old Scoob, who goes on a roadtrip with his grandmother. It received starred reviews from Publishers Weekly and Booklist, and debuted on the Children's Middle Grade Hardcover New York Times bestseller list, at #5. Stone says the inspiration for the novel was a Twitter headline about a shoplifting grandma in Atlanta who turned out to be an international jewel thief.

Other works

Her second young adult novel, Odd One Out, is about three queer teenagers of color in a love triangle and explores themes of gender, sexual fluidity and identity. It was published in 2018 by Crown Books for Young Readers. It also received a starred review from Booklist. In 2019, her third novel, Jackpot, following a gas station clerk that she sold a winning lottery ticket to, was published by Crown. Stone originally wrote the novel in 2015.

In September 2019, it announced that Stone would write a novel focused on Shuri, from Marvel's Black Panther. It was published by Scholastic in 2020.

Stone wrote a young adult novel Blackout, released in June 2021, which she co-authored with Dhonielle Clayton, Tiffany D. Jackson, Angie Thomas, Ashley Woodfolk, and Nicola Yoon. 

Aside from young adult fiction and middle grade, Stone also writes essays, and her short fiction has appeared in multiple anthologies.

Starting in February 2022, Stone presented the 6 episode Marvel and Sirius XM podcast, the history of Marvel comics: Black Panther.

Bibliography 
Young adult fiction

 Dear Martin (Crown Books for Young Readers, 2017)
Odd One Out (Crown Books for Young Readers, 2018)
Jackpot (Crown Books for Young Readers, 2019)
Dear Justyce (Crown Books for Young Readers, 2022)
Shuri: A Black Panther Novel (Scholastic, 2020)
Shuri: The Vanished (Scholastic, 2021)

Middle Grade fiction
Clean Getaway (Crown Books for Young Readers, 2020)

References 

Living people
Women writers of young adult literature
21st-century American women writers
21st-century American novelists
American LGBT writers
Spelman College alumni
American women novelists
1985 births
African-American novelists